The 1783 Great Meteor was a meteor procession observed on 18 August 1783 from the British Isles, at a time when such phenomena were not well understood. The meteor was the subject of much discussion in the Philosophical Transactions of the Royal Society and was the subject of a detailed study by Charles Blagden.

Observations

The event occurred between 21:15 and 21:30 on 18 August 1783, a clear, dry night. Analysis of observations has indicated that the meteor entered Earth's atmosphere over the North Sea, before passing over the east coast of Scotland and England and the English Channel; it finally broke up, after a passage within the atmosphere of around a thousand miles (around 1600 km), over south-western France or northern Italy.

There were many witnesses. Perhaps the most prominent was Tiberius Cavallo, an Italian natural philosopher who had happened to be amongst a group of people on the terrace at Windsor Castle at the time the meteor appeared. Cavallo published his account of the phenomenon in v. 74 of the Philosophical Transactions :

Cavallo noted both that the meteor, which was visible for around thirty seconds in total, appeared to split into several smaller bodies (a meteor procession) immediately following the main mass and that a rumbling noise, "as it were of thunder at a great distance", was heard around ten minutes after the meteor appeared, which he speculated "was the report of the meteor's explosion". Other accounts, such as those of Alexander Aubert and Richard Lovell Edgeworth, noted red and blue colour tints in the fireball.

Some accounts appeared rather more fanciful; the London Magazine mentioned a letter by a lieutenant on a British warship which had been positioned north of Ireland "who relates he saw the same meteor moving along the north-east quarter [...] but he adds something singular enough, namely, that a little time afterwards, he saw it moving back again, the contrary way to which it came". The author added that "several other observations of this meteor have come into my hands, but they are so inconsistent with these already related, as well as with one another, that I forebear to mention them".

Gilbert White, writing in 1787, was to remember the "amazing and portentous" summer of 1783 as "full of horrible phaenomena [...] alarming meteors and tremendous thunder-storms that affrighted and distressed the different counties of this kingdom".

Visual depictions

One of Cavallo's five companions on the terrace was the artist Thomas Sandby, who in collaboration with his brother Paul based a now well-known engraving on the event. A print of this engraving is in the collection of the Hunterian Museum and Art Gallery at Glasgow University. A second engraving was produced by a schoolmaster, Henry Robinson, who observed the meteor from the village of Winthorpe, Nottinghamshire. Further engravings, based on the drawings of the authors and presented in a fold-out form, were included with articles by Cavallo and Nathaniel Pigott in the Philosophical Transactions.

A painting traditionally thought to be of the 1759 apparition of Halley's Comet and attributed to the "English Canaletto", Samuel Scott, has in more recent years been interpreted as depicting a large fireball meteor given its generally uncometary appearance. Further work by Jay Pasachoff and Roberta Olson has suggested that the painting is not in fact by Scott, and that it depicts the third stage of the 1783 fireball, viewed over the Thames.

Possible relation to meteorite falls

It has been speculated that the Hambleton Pallasite, a rare type of meteorite found in 2005 in Hambleton, North Yorkshire, may be related to the 1783 Great Meteor, based on the latter's track, and on weathering on the pallasite's surface. In support of this, in 2008 the terrestrial age of the Hambleton meteorite was determined to be around 225 years.

See also
 Earth-grazing fireball
 1972 Great Daylight Fireball

References

External links
 "Crowd-sourcing eighteenth-century science: the Great Fireball of 1783", The Repository, the Royal Society History of Science blog, Noah Moxham, 16 October 2013
 Sandby aquatint of observation from the terrace at Windsor, British Library
 Mezzotint based on Robinson's depiction of meteor seen from Winthorpe, British Museum

Meteoroids
Modern Earth impact events
1783 in Great Britain
17830818
Astronomy in the United Kingdom